Chang Yi-ning (born November 13, 1957 in Taipei) is a Taiwanese sport shooter. He has been selected to compete for Chinese Taipei in pistol shooting at the 2004 Summer Olympics, and has attained a top seven finish in free pistol at the 2002 ISSF World Championships.

Chang qualified for the Chinese Taipei squad, as a lone male athlete, in pistol shooting at the 2004 Summer Olympics in Athens. He managed to get a minimum qualifying score of 581 to gain an Olympic quota place for Chinese Taipei in the free pistol, following his outstanding eighth-place finish at the Worlds two years earlier. Chang got off to a disastrous start by shooting a hapless 569 out of a possible 600 in the 10 m air pistol, slipping further off to fortieth from a field of forty-seven shooters. Three days later, in the 50 m pistol, Chang continued his Olympic flop from a bitter air pistol defeat to launch a dismal 548 in the qualifying round, forcing him in a thirtieth-place tie with 52-year-old Argentine shooter Maximo Modesti.

References

External links

1957 births
Living people
Taiwanese male sport shooters
Olympic shooters of Taiwan
Shooters at the 2004 Summer Olympics
Shooters at the 2002 Asian Games
Shooters at the 2006 Asian Games
Sport shooters from Qinghai
Asian Games competitors for Chinese Taipei